The Electro-Magnet, and Mechanics Intelligencer  was an 1840 newspaper published by Thomas Davenport, inventor of the electric motor. This newspaper, published in New York City, was the first printed on a press run by electricity. It was the first American periodical devoted to electricity and the world's first electrical technical journal.

Description 

Davenport already had mechanical lathes powered by electric motors in 1836, so had decided to expand this concept to other applications. He reported on December 13, 1839, that he mechanically attached a hundred-pound electric motor to a printing press. He was the first to use this electro-mechanical press idea. The Electro-Magnet and Mechanics Intelligencer was a newspaper he printed, becoming the first printed using electricity as power to run the press. The power for his electric motor he used for the press came from a battery of amalgamated zinc and sheets of platinized silver.

The periodical, a weekly publication, was the first in America devoted to the subject of electricity. It was the world's first electrical technical journal written specifically for those interested in mechanical devices related to electricity.

Davenport was the sole editor of The Electro-Magnet, and Mechanics Intelligencer. The paper was eleven inches by fourteen inches in size and had eight pages with four columns to a page. He published his issues in New York City at 42 Stanton Street in 1840. The first issue was put out January 18. It had on the front page an article talking about how the power of electro-magnetism and his new invention of the electromagnetic motor could be used for the benefit of people by saving labor.

Davenport wrote in his newspaper on the second issue put out on January 25 on various subjects besides electrical or magnetic related subjects. "No. 2, Vol. 1" looked physically very much like the first issue with the same number of pages and columns. The first page had an article on "The Origin of Galvanism", "The Vision of Columbus", and "The Fancy Dress Ball." He knew there were many skeptics of his new electric motor invention and responded to their concerns in this issue.  
 
Davenport used this application of an electric printing press for demonstration purposes to show an example of what could be done with his new electric motor invention. Many business people submitted possible uses for his new device and he decided that printing a newspaper would be the most effective way of showing what could be done with his invention. In the newspaper he asked for investors to help him financially develop ideas he had for electric motor applications. In spite of his plea for investors in his journal Davenport ultimately did not turn a profit from his motor invention, mainly because the batteries needed to operate it were too expensive.

Demise 
Davenport was optimistic that his paper would be successful, but before the third printing due on February 1, he wrote a letter to his brother in Brandon, New York, on January 28 of his concern that he was not able to pay an editor and had to do all the work himself. The newspaper-journal experiment was discontinued then due to lack of enough subscribers.

Davenport did a second similar journal in July entitled The Magnet; Devoted to Arts, Science and Mechanism, but that venture failed also. It was printed in quarto form on a sheet 16 inches by 22 inches. He wrote in the one issue that he had demonstration models of his electrical motors at No. 4 Little Green Street printing the Declaration of Independence.

References

Sources 

1840 establishments in New York (state)
Defunct newspapers published in New York (state)
Publications established in 1840